The Justin Weed House is located in Kenosha, Wisconsin. It was listed on the National Register of Historic Places in 1974 and on the State Register of Historic Places in 1989.

References

Houses on the National Register of Historic Places in Wisconsin
National Register of Historic Places in Kenosha County, Wisconsin
Houses in Kenosha County, Wisconsin
Buildings and structures in Kenosha, Wisconsin
Greek Revival houses in Wisconsin
Cobblestone architecture
Houses completed in 1848